Marakele National Park is a National Park, part of the Waterberg Biosphere in Limpopo Province, South Africa.

Flora and fauna
Marakele is home to the big five (buffalo did not exist in the park, but 20 disease-free buffalo (nine cows and eleven bulls) were re-introduced on 15 October 2013) as well as sixteen species of antelopes and over 250 species of birds, including the largest colony of Cape griffon vultures in the world (around 800 breeding pairs). The Matlabas River runs through the park.

Birds found within the park are: 

 African harrier-hawk
 African scops owl

 Cape rock thrush

 Cape vulture
 Fiery-necked nightjar
 Freckled nightjar
 Jackal buzzard
 Purple roller
 Red-eyed bulbul

 Southern boubou

 Snake eagle
 Spotted eagle

 Wahlberg’s eagle

Mammals found within the park are: 
 Black rhino

 Brown hyena
 Chacma baboon

 Elephant
 Hyena
 Impala

 Kudu

 Leopard

 Lion
 Sable
 Vervet monkey
 Waterbuck

 White rhino

Vegetation 
The park contains a mix of vegetation types, with half the park covered by Waterberg Moist Bushveld and 42% covered by Mixed Bushveld.

History
The area now constituting Marakele was home to several iron-age settlements which are not yet open to public viewing. Prior to its foundation as a National Park, it was home to naturalist Eugène Marais.

Activities 
The park is accessible to all passenger vehicles, with the camp and tent sites on good roads. Also, approximately 80 km of roads within the park are accessible to all vehicles, with the remaining requiring a four-wheel drive vehicle. There is a 4x4 eco trail, along with morning and sunset game drives.

A tarred mountain pass leads up to the top of the Waterberg massif.

The park contains bird hides, picnic sites and multiple viewing points at the Bollonoto, Bontle and Tlopi dams. 

There are morning and sunset bush walks.

There is an annual birding census organised by the Marakele Honorary rangers.

Accommodation
Two tented camps are laid out in Marakele, namely Tlopi and Bontle.

Bontle Camping Site 
Bontle has 36 camping spots, along with 10 tented units.

Tlopi Tented Camp 
Tlopi is situated on the banks of the Apiesrivierpoort Dam.

Gallery

References

External links

 Marakele National Park
 Marakele Contractual National Park

Protected areas of Limpopo
Protected areas established in 1944
National parks of South Africa